Franconia Airport  is a public airport located in Franconia, New Hampshire, two miles (3 km) south of the central business district of Franconia, in Grafton County, New Hampshire, United States. The airport is the home of the Franconia Soaring Association. There are no commercial flights available.

See also
List of airports in New Hampshire

References

External links 

Airports in New Hampshire
Transportation buildings and structures in Grafton County, New Hampshire
Franconia, New Hampshire